In enzymology, a 5-carboxymethyl-2-hydroxymuconate Delta-isomerase is an enzyme that catalyzes the chemical reaction

5-carboxymethyl-2-hydroxymuconate  5-carboxy-2-oxohept-3-enedioate

Hence, this enzyme has one substrate, 5-carboxymethyl-2-hydroxymuconate, and one product, 5-carboxy-2-oxohept-3-enedioate.

This enzyme belongs to the family of isomerases, specifically those intramolecular oxidoreductases transposing C=C bonds.  The systematic name of this enzyme class is 5-carboxymethyl-2-hydroxymuconate Delta2,Delta4-2-oxo,Delta3-isomerase. This enzyme participates in tyrosine metabolism and benzoate degradation via hydroxylation.

Structural studies

References 

 

EC 5.3.3
Enzymes of known structure